This is the 69th edition of Torneo di Viareggio, the annual youth football tournament held in Viareggio, Tuscany.

Format 
The 40 teams are seeded in 10 groups, 5 groups in pool A and 5 groups in pool B. Each team from a group meets the others in a single tie. The winning club from each group and six best runners-up progress to the knockout stage. All matches in the final rounds are single tie. During the round of 16 no extra time will be played in case of a draw, with the match proceeding immediately to penalty kicks. From the quarterfinals on, matches include 30 minutes extra time and penalties to be played if the draw between teams still holds.

Participating teams
40 teams participate in the tournament. The list of the teams are below.

Italian teams

  Ancona
  Ascoli
  Atalanta
  Bari
  Bologna
  Cagliari
  Empoli
  Fiorentina
  Genoa
  Inter Milan
  Juventus
  Maceratese
  Milan
  Napoli
  Parma
  Perugia
  Pisa
  Reggiana
  Serie D Representatives
  Sassuolo
  SPAL
  Spezia
  Torino

European teams

  Club Brugge
  Dukla Prague
  PAS Giannina
  PSV
  Rijeka
  Zenit Saint Petersburg

American teams

  Athletic Union
  Belgrano
  CAI
  Cortuluá
  Deportivo Camioneros
  LIAC New York
  Osasco
  Toronto

African teams

  Abuja
  Garden City Panthers
  Ujana

Group stage

Pool A

Group 1

Group 2

Group 3

Group 4

Group 5

Pool B

Group 6

Group 7

Group 8

Group 9

Group 10

Knockout stage

References

External links
 Official Site (Italian) 

2017
2016–17 in Italian football
2016–17 in European football
2016–17 in CONCACAF football
2017 in South American football
2017 in African football
March 2017 sports events in Italy